Truttikon is a municipality in the district of Andelfingen in the canton of Zürich in Switzerland.

Geography

Of this area, 64.2% is used for agricultural purposes, while 28.4% is forested. Of the rest of the land, 7% is settled (buildings or roads) and the remainder (0.5%) is non-productive (rivers, glaciers or mountains).

Demographics
, 3.2% of the population was made up of foreign nationals. Over the last 10 years the population has grown at a rate of 13.2%. Most of the population speaks German  (95.9%), with English being second most common ( 1.4%) and Italian being third ( 0.5%).

In the 2007 election the most popular party was the SVP which received 41.5% of the vote.  The next three most popular parties were the local small left-wing parties (15.7%), the SPS (15.5%) and the FDP (8.8%).

The age distribution of the population is children and teenagers (0–19 years old) make up 29.7% of the population, while adults (20–64 years old) make up 58.9% and seniors (over 64 years old) make up 11.5%.  In Truttikon about 86.3% of the population (between age 25-64) have completed either non-mandatory upper secondary education or additional higher education (either university or a Fachhochschule).

Truttikon has an unemployment rate of 0.77%.  , there were 71 people employed in the primary economic sector and about 22 businesses involved in this sector.  16 people are employed in the secondary sector and there are 5 businesses in this sector.  22 people are employed in the tertiary sector, with 8 businesses in this sector.

References

External links 
  

Municipalities of the canton of Zürich